Welcome To Our Village, Please Invade Carefully is a sitcom on BBC Radio 4 (pilot and first series aired on BBC Radio 2), written by Eddie Robson and produced by Ed Morrish. It concerns the invasion of the small Buckinghamshire village of Cresdon Green by an alien race called the Geonin. The programme stars Hattie Morahan as Katrina Lyons, a 30-something professional from London who was visiting her parents at the time of the invasion, with Charles Edwards as Uljabaan, the leader of the aliens in smooth-talking human form. The Radio Times called it "the sitcom success story of 2012..."

The pilot episode featured Katherine Parkinson in the part of Katrina, whilst the pilot and first series featured Julian Rhind-Tutt as Uljabaan. The pilot aired on 5 July 2012, the first series aired 7–28 March 2013, and the second series began on 15 October 2014.

Cast
Hattie Morahan (Series 1 & 2) and Katherine Parkinson (Pilot) – Katrina Lyons
Charles Edwards (Series 2) and Julian Rhind-Tutt (Series 1) – Field Commander Uljabaan
Peter Davison – Richard Lyons
Jan Francis – Margaret Lyons
Hannah Murray – Lucy Alexander
John-Luke Roberts – Computer

References

Further reading

BBC Radio 2 programmes
Welcome to our Village, Please Invade Carefully
2012 radio programme debuts

External links
 BBC homepage for the programme